Kenarrudkhaneh Rural District is a rural district (dehestan) in the Central District of Golpayegan County, Isfahan Province, Iran. At the 2006 census, its population was 8,721, in 2,520 families.  The rural district has 38 villages.

References 

Rural Districts of Isfahan Province
Golpayegan County